Echium vulcanorum is a species of flowering plants of the family Boraginaceae. The species is endemic to Cape Verde. It is listed as an endangered plant by the IUCN. The species was first described in 1935 by Auguste Chevalier. Its local name is língua-de-vaca (cow tongue), a name that may also refer to the related species Echium hypertropicum and Echium stenosiphon. The oil of its seeds contains γ-linolenic acid, and is used for medicinal and dietary purposes.

Description

The plant is a very branched shrub that reaches 1–2 m height. Its leaves are lanceolate and 5-7  cm long and 1-1.5 cm wide. Its flowers are white, rarely bluish.

Distribution and ecology
Echium vulcanorum is restricted to the island of Fogo, where it occurs between 1,600 and 2,400 m elevation, in semi-arid zones.

References

Further reading
''The endemic vascular plants of the Cape Verde Islands, W Africa, Sommerfeltia 24, 1997,  C. Brochmann, Ø. H. Rustan, W. Lobin & N. Kilian, ISSN 0800-6865,  

vulcanorum
Endemic flora of Cape Verde
Flora of Fogo, Cape Verde
Taxa named by Auguste Chevalier